Ruud "Rudy" Degenaar (21 August 1963 – 7 June 1989 near Zanderij Airport) was a Dutch footballer. He died at the age of 25, when on 7 June 1989 he was killed in the Surinam Airways Flight PY764 air crash in Paramaribo.

Club career
During his career he played for Heracles Almelo.

Personal life
His father, Dolf Degenaar, was also a professional footballer, who played for PEC Zwolle in the 1960s.

Death
He was invited by Sonny Hasnoe, the founder of the Colourful 11, to be part of the team and travel to Suriname to play in the Boxel Kleurrijk Tournament with three Surinamese teams. The Surinam Airways Flight PY764 crashed during approach to Zanderij International Airport, killing 176 of the 187 on board, including Degenaar and his girlfriend Hedwig Wolthuis, making it the worst ever aviation disaster in Suriname's history. Among the dead were a total of 15 members of the Colourful 11; only three of them survived.

References

External links
 Degenaar at AndroKnel.nl 
 Crash report
 Iwan Tol: Eindbesteming Zanderij; het vergeten verhaal van het Kleurrijk Elftal 

1963 births
1989 deaths
People from Para District
Association football central defenders
Dutch footballers
Surinamese emigrants to the Netherlands
Heracles Almelo players
Eerste Divisie players
Eredivisie players
Footballers killed in the Surinam Airways Flight 764 crash